Forrest Percival Sherman (October 30, 1896 – July 22, 1951) was an admiral in the United States Navy and the youngest person to serve as Chief of Naval Operations until Admiral Elmo Zumwalt in 1970. The  was named for him.

Early life and education
Born in Merrimack, New Hampshire, Sherman was a member of the United States Naval Academy class of 1918, graduating in June 1917 due to America's entry into World War I.

Naval career
During and shortly after World War I, Sherman served in European waters as an officer of the gunboat  and destroyer .

Following duty as Flag Lieutenant to Commander Control Force, Atlantic Fleet, he received flight training at Naval Air Station Pensacola, Florida. Designated a Naval Aviator in December 1922, Lieutenant Sherman was assigned to Fighter Squadron VF-2B until 1924, when he returned to Pensacola as an instructor. While in the latter ship, he commanded Scouting Squadron VS-2B and was Flag Secretary to Commander Aircraft Squadrons, Battle Fleet.

Promoted to the ranks of lieutenant commander in 1930 and commander in 1937, during that decade Sherman served at the Naval Academy, commanded Fighter Squadron VF-1B, had charge of the Aviation Ordnance Section of the Bureau of Ordnance, was Navigator of the aircraft carrier , and had duty on a number of flag staffs. In 1941–42, he served with the Office of the Chief of Naval Operations and was a member of the Permanent Joint Board on Defense, Canada-United States.

Commander Sherman worked closely with then US Army Major Albert C. Wedemeyer, author of the "Victory Plan of 1941", "the blueprint... for the mobilization of the United States Army for World War 2". Wedemeyer, while working in the War Plans Department, was commissioned to write the "Victory Plan by General George C. Marshall."

In May 1942, after reaching the rank of captain, Sherman took command of the carrier , taking the ship through the first month of the Solomon Islands campaign.

After Wasp was sunk by a Japanese submarine on September 15, 1942, Sherman was awarded the Navy Cross for his extraordinary heroism in command of the carrier during the opening days of the South Pacific operations. Sherman then became Chief of Staff to Commander Air Force, Pacific Fleet. In November 1943, Rear Admiral Sherman was assigned as Deputy Chief of Staff to the Pacific Fleet commander, Admiral Chester W. Nimitz. He held that position for the remainder of World War II, playing a critical role in planning the offensives that brought victory in the Pacific, and was present when Japan surrendered on September 2, 1945. Following a short tour as a carrier division commander, in December 1945 Vice Admiral Sherman became Deputy Chief of Naval Operations.

Sherman's next assignment, beginning in January 1948, was to command the navy's operating forces in the Mediterranean Sea. He was recalled to Washington, D.C., at the end of October 1949 to become Chief of Naval Operations, with the rank of admiral. During the next sixteen months, he helped the navy recover from a period of intense political controversy (as in the so-called "Revolt of the Admirals"), and oversaw its responses to the twin challenges of a hot war in Korea and an intensifying cold war elsewhere in the world.

On July 22, 1951, while on a military and diplomatic trip to Europe, Admiral Forrest Sherman died in Naples, Italy, following a sudden series of heart attacks. He was buried at Arlington National Cemetery on July 27, 1951.

Legacy

Also named in his honor was Sherman Island, Antarctica; Forrest Sherman Field at NAS Pensacola, home of the Blue Angels; and Forrest Sherman Field at Hospital Point at the US Naval Academy. The US Department of Defense school in Naples, Italy was formerly called Forrest Sherman High School.

Decorations and medals
Admiral Sherman's decorations include:

References

 The quotes from the "Victory Plan of 1941" and Captain Forrest Sherman are from Writing the Victory Plan of 1941, Charles E. Kirkpatrick, Center of Military History, Washington, D.C., 1942
 
 Some material is from the official site of USS Forrest Sherman'', produced by the navy and therefore in the public domain.

External links

 Material on Forest Sherman at the US Navy Historical Center
 ANC Explorer
Forrest P. Sherman Papers, 1903-1941 (bulk 1903-1917) MS 557 held by Special Collections & Archives, Nimitz Library at the United States Naval Academy

1896 births
1951 deaths
United States Naval Aviators
United States Navy admirals
Recipients of the Navy Cross (United States)
United States Naval Academy alumni
Chiefs of Naval Operations
People from Merrimack, New Hampshire
Recipients of the Legion of Merit
United States Navy World War II admirals
Burials at Arlington National Cemetery